Hedvig Wessel (born 25 August 1995) is a Norwegian freestyle skier. She was born in Oslo. She  competed at the 2014 Winter Olympics in Sochi.

She represents the club IL Heming.

References

External links
 
 
 

1995 births
Living people
Skiers from Oslo
Freestyle skiers at the 2014 Winter Olympics
Freestyle skiers at the 2018 Winter Olympics
Norwegian female freestyle skiers
Olympic freestyle skiers of Norway
21st-century Norwegian women